Euryomma may refer to:
 Euryomma (alga), a red alga genus in the family Solieriaceae
 Euryomma (fly), a fly genus in the family Fanniidae